The Confederate Secret Service refers to any of a number of official and semi-official secret service organizations and operations conducted by the Confederate States of America during the American Civil War. Some of the organizations were under the direction of the Confederate government, others operated independently with government approval, while still others were either completely independent of the government or operated with only its tacit acknowledgment.

By 1864, the Confederate government was attempting to gain control over the various operations that had sprung up since the beginning of the war, but often with little success. Secret legislation was put before the Confederate Congress to create an official Special and Secret Bureau of the War Department. The legislation was not enacted until March 1865 and was never implemented; however, a number of groups and operations have historically been referred to as having been part of the Confederate Secret Service. In April 1865, most of the official papers of the Secret Service were burned by Confederate Secretary of State Judah P. Benjamin just before the Confederate government evacuated Richmond, although a few pages of a financial ledger remain. Thus, the full story of Confederate secret operations may never be known.

Military operations and officially sanctioned Secret Service activities

Agents within the United States
The Confederacy benefited from the services of a number of "traditional" spies including Rose O'Neal Greenhow and Aaron Van Camp, who appear to have been members of an espionage ring during the formative period of the Confederate government. Greenhow was incarcerated at the Old Capitol Prison in Washington, D.C. Thomas Jordan recruited Greenhow and provided her with cypher code.

Other known espionage agents include Belle Boyd and Catherine Virginia Baxley. John Surratt served as both a courier and spy.

John H. Sothoron appears to have led the Confederate underground in St. Mary's County, Maryland. Col. Sothoron lived near Charlotte Hall Military Academy. His son, Webster, attended the school and was reputed to be a spy. Richard Thomas (Zarvona) and David Herold were also students, although Herold's attending is disputed.
 
Samuel Mudd, of Charles County, Maryland, appears to have lent shelter to agents and harbored John Wilkes Booth, although Mudd's role is disputed.

Foreign agents
The Confederacy's first secret-service agent may have been James D. Bulloch. In 1861, almost immediately after the attack on Fort Sumter, Bulloch traveled to Liverpool, England, to establish a base of operations. Britain was officially neutral in the conflict between North and South, but private and public sentiment favored the Confederacy. Britain was also willing to buy cotton that could be smuggled past the Union blockade, which provided the South with its only real source of hard currency. Bulloch established a relationship with the shipping firm of Fraser, Trenholm & Company to buy and sell Confederate cotton, using this currency to purchase arms and ammunition, uniforms, and other supplies for the war effort. Fraser, Trenholm & Co. became, in effect, the Confederacy's international bankers. Bulloch also arranged for the construction and secret purchase of the commerce raider CSS Alabama, as well as many of the blockade runners that acted as the Confederacy's commercial lifeline.

Jacob Thompson was the Confederate commissioner in Canada. He distributed money, coordinated agents, and may have planned covert operations. He was involved in the attempt to liberate Confederate prisoners at Johnson's Island, a Union facility which also housed political prisoners.

Thompson met with Clement Laird Vallandigham, an Ohio politician. Vallandigham, a potential presidential candidate against Lincoln, was arrested by Union General Ambrose Burnside and deported to the Confederacy. Vallandigham made his way to Canada.

Signal Corps
The Confederate Signal Corps was established in 1862. Nearly 1,200 men were in the secret service, most of whom were well-to-do and knew more than one language. Example: Alexander Campbell Rucker, brother of Col Edmund Winchester Rucker, was in the Confederate Secret Service. -from an article in the Owensboro Messenger (Owensboro, Kentucky) 16 Feb, 1922.

Major William Norris was their commander. Norris may have worked under Braxton Bragg. On April 26, 1865, Norris took the position of the Commissioner of Prisoner Exchange Robert Ould. Ould may have been the civilian liaison to the corps, and Bragg the military liaison, with both reporting to Jefferson Davis or Judah Benjamin.

Thomas Nelson Conrad was a scout and spy who worked with Norris.

Torpedo Bureau
The Torpedo Bureau, authorized on October 31, 1862, and headed by Brigadier General Gabriel Rains, was charged with the production of various explosive devices, including land mines, naval mines, and "coal torpedoes."

Submarine Battery Service

Created at the same time as the Torpedo Bureau, the Submarine Battery Service was the Confederate Navy's torpedo specialists. The service primarily utilized electrically-detonated torpedoes to protect the South's waterways. Originally under Commander Matthew Fontaine Maury, known as "The Pathfinder of the Seas", Maury was succeeded by his protégé, Lt. Hunter Davidson, when Maury was sent abroad to further his experiments involving electrical torpedoes and to procure needed supplies and ships. The service operated along the James River between Richmond and Hampton Roads, Virginia, Wilmington, North Carolina, Charleston, South Carolina, and Savannah, Georgia, among other locales.

Bureau of Special and Secret Service
In November 1864, the Confederate House of Representatives in secret session referred a bill “for the establishment of a Bureau of Special and Secret Service” to their Committee on Military Affairs. The bureau was to have a “polytechnic corps”. The existing “torpedo corps” was to be incorporated into the bureau. New inventions were to be encouraged.

Secret Service operations in Canada and the Maritime provinces

Confederate agents operated around Halifax, Quebec City, Niagara, Toronto, and (especially) Montreal.

Sanctioned destructionists, privateers, and licensed operators

The bounty law
The Confederacy knew it was in trouble from the beginning of war without its own Navy. The few privately owned ships that could be converted to military service were no match for the Union Navy. On May 21, 1861, the Confederate Congress enacted an amendment to their May 6, 1861 Declaration of War which provided that
the government of the Confederate States will pay to the cruiser or cruisers of any private armed vessel commissioned under said act, twenty per centum on the value of each and every vessel of war belonging to the enemy, that may be sunk or destroyed by such private armed vessel or vessels, the value of the armament to be included in the estimate.
In 1862, possibly following a suggestion, the Confederate Congress enacted a bounty of fifty percent of the value of any vessel destroyed by means of a new invention:
The Congress of the Confederate States of America do enact, That the first section of the above entitled Act be so amended, that, in case any person or persons shall invent or construct any new machine or engine, or contrive any new method for destroying the armed vessels of the enemy, he or they shall receive fifty per centum of the value of each and every such vessel that may be sunk or destroyed, by means of such invention or contrivance,  

This attracted the attention of entrepreneurs. Horace Hunley put together a group of investors to finance the submarine that bears his name, hoping to profit from the bounties. Private individuals with engineering experience such as E. C. Singer, C. Williams, and Zere McDaniel developed and patented new torpedoes and fuses.

Special and detached service

The coal torpedo

Developed by Thomas Courtenay of the Confederate Secret Service, coal torpedoes were hollow metal castings resembling a lump of coal. The castings were filled with powder and then secreted in the coal bunker of enemy vessels. When the coal replicas were shoveled into the fire boxes of ship's boilers, the resulting explosions either damaged or sank the ship. A hollowed out piece of wood filled with powder was used against river steamers. These could be concealed in the fuel piles of cord wood stacked along the river banks.

Active measures operations

The Dahlgren Affair incensed Jefferson Davis and the Confederate leadership. Combined with the desperate, dismal fortunes on the battlefield, the secret service was re-invigorated in 1864. It was involved in the 19 October 1864 St. Albans Raid in Vermont by personnel in Canada, the arson plans/attacks in northern cities, and future Kentucky governor Blackburn's biological warfare plot. Many historians believe the attempted John Wilkes Booth plots in the assassination of President Lincoln in August 1864 and April 1865 may have been connected to the Secret Service which was seen as reciprocation for the Stanton's Dahlgren orders. This is argued in the Edward Steers, Jr. book, Blood on the Moon: The Assassination of Abraham Lincoln.

Confederate Secret Service in popular culture

In literature
 On the Wing of Occasions, by Joel Chandler Harris, Doubleday, New York, 1904
 The Butcher's Cleaver, (A Tale of the Confederate Secret Services.) by W. Patrick Lang Rosemont Books, 2007, 
 Death Piled Hard, (A Tale of the Confederate Secret Services.) by W. Patrick Lang iUniverse 2009 
 Down the Sky, (Volume Three of the "Strike the Tent" trilogy) by W. Patrick Lang iUniverse 2012 
 The Shenandoah Spy by Francis Hamit, Brass Cannon Books, 2008 
 The Queen of Washington by Francis Hamit, Brass Cannon Books 2011

In television
 A self-igniting liquid, referred to as "Greek fire" in Season 1 Episodes 7–11 of the BBC America television series Copper, is featured as part of a plot by Confederate Secret Service agents to burn down New York City, in 1864.

See also

Nitre and Mining Bureau
American Civil War spies
Black Dispatches
Bureau of Military Information
Confederate Army of Manhattan
List of New York Civil War regiments
New York City in the American Civil War
New York National Guard (American Civil War)
St. Nicholas Hotel (New York City)

References

Further reading
 Tidwell,  William A., James O. Hall and David Winfred Gaddy. Come Retribution: The Confederate Secret Service and the Assassination of Lincoln (1988)
 Matthew Fontaine Maury, Scientist of the Sea, Frances Leigh Williams, (1969) 
 The Pathfinder of the Seas, The Life of Matthew Fontaine Maury, by John W. Wayland, (1930)
 Life of Matthew Fontaine Maury, U.S.N. and C.S.N., by Diana Fontaine Maury-Corbin.
 The Secret Service of the Confederate States in Europe; James Dunwody Bulloch
 Perry, Milton F. "Infernal Machines: The story of Confederate submarine and mine warfare." Louisiana State University Press, 1985.
 Crowley, R.O. "Confederate Torpedo Service" in The Century / Volume 56, Issue 2, The Century Company, New York, June 1898.
 Bulloch, James D. "The Secret Service of the Confederate States in Europe; or, How the Confederate Cruisers Were Equipped." 1883.
 Tidwell, William A. "April '65." Kent State University Press, 1995.
 Kochan, Michael P. and John C. Wideman. "Torpedoes: Another look at the Infernal Machines of the Civil War." 2002.
 United States Government, Intelligence in the Civil War. Washington, D.C., Central Intelligence Agency, 2005.

1861 establishments in the Confederate States of America
Military units and formations established in 1861
1865 disestablishments in the Confederate States of America
Government of the Confederate States of America
Military history of the Confederate States of America
American Civil War espionage
Defunct intelligence agencies